The Suri District is a district (bakhsh) in Rumeshkan County, Lorestan Province, Iran. At the 2006 census, it had 16,262 inhabitants, living in 3,350 households.  The district is entirely rural with two rural districts: Suri Rural District, and Rumiani Rural District, with a total of nineteen villages.

Mount Vyznhar (Vznyar), the highest mountain in the county, is located in Suri District. On its slopes are the ruins of Kohzad Castle.

Notes and references 

Districts of Lorestan Province